Two ships of the United States Navy have been named Affray.

 , a minesweeper in service 2 December 1941.
 , a minesweeper commissioned 8 December 1958.

Sources
 

United States Navy ship names